Danny Betancourt Chacón (born May 27, 1981 in Santiago de Cuba, Cuba) is a right-handed Olympian baseball pitcher who has played for Santiago de Cuba in the Cuban National Series, as well as the Cuba national baseball team.  He was on the Cuba national baseball team that brought home a gold medal from 2004 Summer Olympics, in Athens.

References

1981 births
Living people
2009 World Baseball Classic players
Olympic baseball players of Cuba
Baseball players at the 2004 Summer Olympics
Olympic gold medalists for Cuba
Olympic medalists in baseball
2013 World Baseball Classic players
Medalists at the 2004 Summer Olympics
2015 WBSC Premier12 players